The Great Western Railway (GWR) Bogie Class  were broad gauge steam locomotives for passenger train work. The first two locomotives of this class were introduced into service in August/September 1849, with the remainder following between June 1854 and March 1855. All but one were withdrawn between October 1871 and 1873, with the final locomotive being withdrawn in December 1880.

Corsair and Brigand

The first two locomotives were built at Swindon Works in 1849 for working trains on the steep and tightly-curved  South Devon Railway which at that time was operated by locomotives from the Great Western Railway. The frames only ran from the front of the flangeless forward driving wheels to the rear buffer beam. The bogie swivelled in a ball-and-socket joint, riveted to a gusset under the boiler barrel. Early examples  were fitted with sledge brakes, mounted between the driving  wheels, but these were later replaced with a conventional brake acting on just one coupled wheel. The operation of South Devon Railway had been contracted by that company to Messrs Evans and Geach from 1851 – using new s designed by Daniel Gooch – and so the Bogie Class found use on other parts of the Great Western network. In 1855 additional locomotives were built for the GWR by R and W Hawthorn.

Naming

References

External links
Model at the National Railway Museum, York

Bogie
4-4-0ST locomotives
Broad gauge (7 feet) railway locomotives
Hawthorn locomotives
Railway locomotives introduced in 1849
Scrapped locomotives